Highland Hall, located in MidTown Columbus, Georgia was built in 1857 by the Ellis family and originally sat on a ten-acre lot. It was named to the National Register of Historic Places on 1980.

Architecture

The house is a Greek Revival, raised cottage that was originally two rooms deep, symmetrically flanking a large central hall.  A two-story rear addition was built at about 1905, incorporating what is thought to have been the original detached kitchen.  The pedimented front porch has four square-sectioned columns and fine cast-iron balustrade and ornamental trim.

History

The Ellis’ sold Highland Hall in 1878 for $700.  During the next decade, Highland Hall changed hands several times before being sold to Estelle Collins in 1905.  Ms. Collins remained in the home until her death in 1978.

References 

Houses on the National Register of Historic Places in Georgia (U.S. state)
Houses completed in 1857
Houses in Columbus, Georgia
National Register of Historic Places in Muscogee County, Georgia
1857 establishments in Georgia (U.S. state)